The Mountain View Center for the Performing Arts is located in downtown Mountain View, California.  It is operated by the City of Mountain View and hosts a variety of art events. Its home theatre companies include TheatreWorks, Peninsula Youth Theatre, and Upstage Theater.

History
It was founded in 1991 with three stages, and holds performances in theatre, dance, and music.

According to Mercury News, the facility is referred to by Mountain View city employees as the MVCPA. As of August 2017, its executive director was Scott Whisler. An expansion project started in 2017 is to add two dressing rooms, a green room for Second Stages, and improve the Park Stage.

In 2018, a production of the play Frost/Nixon debuted at the center.

See also
Theater in California

References

External links
 Mountain View Center for the Performing Arts official website
 Peninsula Youth Theatre
 TheatreWorks

Buildings and structures in Mountain View, California
Tourist attractions in Santa Clara County, California
Performing arts centers in California
Culture in the San Francisco Bay Area